The 1919 Gotha state election was held on 25 February 1919 to elect the 19 members of the Landtag of Gotha.

Results

References 

Gotha
Elections in Thuringia